CNAP may refer to:

 Cnap Twt, a disused quarry that is a Site of Special Scientific Interest in the Vale of Glamorgan, south Wales
 Calling Name Presentation (CNAP), functionality on phone networks to provide the name identification of the calling party.
 Centre national des arts plastiques (CNAP), a French institution that supports the visual arts
 Clann na Poblachta (CnaP), a defunct Irish republican political party
 Colorado Natural Areas Program, a statewide program to protect threatened and endangered species
 Continuous noninvasive arterial pressure (CNAP), method of measuring arterial blood pressure in real-time